Pseudolabrys  is a genus of bacteria from the family of Nitrobacteraceae. Up to now, only one species of this genus is known (Pseudolabrys taiwanensis).

References

Further reading 
 

Nitrobacteraceae
Monotypic bacteria genera
Bacteria genera